Tallahatta Creek is a stream in the U.S. state of Mississippi.

Tallahatta is a name derived from the Choctaw language meaning "white rock". A variant name is "Tallyhatta Creek".

References

Rivers of Mississippi
Rivers of Lauderdale County, Mississippi
Rivers of Neshoba County, Mississippi
Rivers of Newton County, Mississippi
Mississippi placenames of Native American origin